Carver State Bank is a Black-operated 1927-founded bank that operates in Georgia.

History
The multi-branch banks's headquarters are in Savannah It was founded February 23, 1927 by Savannah-born Louis B. Toomer as Georgia Savings and Realty Corp.

On April 29, 1947 it became a state-supervised bank (with FDIC-insured effective June 1, 1947)), and their name was changed to Carver Savings Bank. In 1962, when Carver "Carver became a full-service commercial bank offering checking accounts" it assumed its present name: Carver State Bank. Like
Carver Federal Savings Bank, to which it is not connected, it is named after George Washington Carver. Carver, like New York-based Carver Federal Savings Bank, "is among the roughly 1,000 government-recognized Community Development Financial Institutions dedicated to economically underserved areas." As a CDFI, Carver is eligible for New Market Tax Credits.

References

External links
 Website

Financial services companies established in 1927
Financial services companies of the United States